Dr. William O. Walker aka W.O. Walker (born William Otis Walker on September 19, 1896 – died October 29, 1981) was an African-American publisher, Cleveland-area politician, and editor of the Call and Post, an African-American newspaper based in Cleveland. He was the African-American to serve in an Ohio Governor's cabinet.

References

External links
W.O. Walker biographical sketch at Cleveland State University archives

William O. Walker at clevelandhistorical.org

1896 births
1981 deaths
American publishers (people)
African-American business executives
American business executives
Politicians from Selma, Alabama
Wilberforce University alumni
Oberlin College alumni
Politicians from Cleveland
Ohio Republicans
20th-century African-American people